Lorenzo Piattoni (27 September 1955 – 14 August 2016), known professionally as Lorenzo Piani, was an Italian singer and songwriter.

Biography

After studying classical piano at the Rossini Conservatory in Pesaro, he released a single. As a musician, he has performed in many countries, including for King Hussein of Jordan. In 1983 he returned to Italy, where he has worked as a composer for the RAI TV. He was involved in programs such as "tandem" and "sul Vediamoci 2" presented by Rita Dalla Chiesa and Fabrizio Frizzi. At the same time he wrote the song "Forza Rimini" for the football club of the city. In the spring of 1990 he released his first album "Sognatori Erranti" on the label NAR. The song Vecchio Poeta was produced and performed with the classic Scarlatti Orchestra of Italy. Lorenzo Piani for seven years, then moved to Scandinavia (Denmark, Norway, Sweden), where he played with his band at clubs. In 1995, he published the RTI Music CD single The Train, and in 1998 the RTI Music album VIVO feeling.
In 2000, Lorenzo Piani began a new adventure as artistic director of Balla Bella Radio Festival Talent Scout project. In 2008, he had an important collaboration with Brian Auger, who played the organ for the album sorpresi Dal Vento. In 2011, he released his fifth album, entitled La Filosofia del CAM. CAM stands for food, love and music. A massive radio promotion brought the song for weeks in the Indie Music Charts.

In July 2013 was released the new album of the singer/songwriter Lorenzo Piani, titled10 ten.
10 is what Lorenzo Piani defines as the perfect number to which he dedicates the track that closes the entire project.
Lorenzo Piani was an artist outside the box of the music business and in his career he has always preferred to success, the freedom to make his music. He was a singer-songwriter who is highly respected abroad, performed live regularly, and just from this, his openness to new experiences he developed the idea of the project 10. 
The travel with the music led him to meet and discuss with other artists from Europe and thus was born the idea of 10, a collaboration
with female artists from different European countries, that they duet with him on three tracks in different idioms.
The meaning of 10 is the vision of life by Piani, and secondly an analysis of the most intimate feelings of men and women. It's a proposal that shows a way to overcome this critical moment of social and economic life, where the human being finds unsuspected resources in its creativity, in being able to read things and events with a "positive winning" mindset. There are also some jazzy moments dedicated to his passion for the music.
For the English speaking market, Nirah, a young performer, duets with Lorenzo in the song THE SOUL, a song that is catchy-sounding and ethno-electronic. 
For the Spanish, Portuguese and Latin markets, María Villalón, an artist of great talent, duets with Lorenzo Piani in the song “Mudar”.
The message of MUDAR that Lorenzo wants to transmit, is a sign of hope in order to change all the negativity that pollutes the existence of human beings, life is to be lived to the fullest.
For Austrian and German Markets, Stephanie, a child prodigy of the German melodic song, duets with Lorenzo Piani in GRANDE AMORE.
Stephanie wanted to sing the song GRANDE AMORE with Lorenzo Piani, in Italian;
for an Austrian singer, an important artistic endeavor.
On 27 March 2015 the instrumental album SHADES OF MUSIC was released, a selection of instrumental tracks, which defines the various nuances of the music.

On 20 November 2015 the single "SENZA UN SORRISO" was released. This release is a track from a new art project, conceived by Lorenzo Piani, POP CLASSIC. It is a crossover project, a musical contamination that originates from an array of pop and classical counterpoint develops. His partner in this project is a star of the opera world, the Sicilian soprano Desirée Rancatore. The soprano Desirée Rancatore's voice is interwoven with the dough soft and persuasive voice of Lorenzo Piani, and the theme comes to life through harmonies typical of classical music. The texts are structured with a book specially written, as well as in the tradition of Italian opera.

On 14 August 2016 his official site announced his death.

Discography

45 rpm 
1983 "45 giri Dolce Annie e Andrea un amico“ EMI Group

33 rpm 
1990 "33 giri e MC Sognatori Erranti“ Nar/Dischi Ricordi

Cd Single 
1992 "Cd Singolo Hvor sod du var“ SNDMUSIC/Audiosparx
1995 "Cd Singolo Il Treno“ RTI Music
2015 "Cd Singolo Senza Un Sorriso" SNDMUSIC

Cd Album 
1998 "CD Album VivoFeelings“ RTI Music
2001 "CD Album New version VivoFeelings“ Sony Music
2008 "CD Album Sorpresi dal Vento“ SNDMUSIC
2011 "CD Album La Filosofia del CAM“ SNDMUSIC
2013 "CD Album 10 Ten“ SNDMUSIC
2015 "CD Album Shades of Music“ SNDMUSIC
2016 "Sensations" SNDMUSIC

DVD Album 
2006 "DVD Album Un Salto E Volo Lungometraggio musicale“ SNDMUSIC/EXA Media

Compilations 
2011 "Italian Voices 1, 2, 3 und 4“ SNDMUSIC/Audiosparx
2011 "Sunny Pop Music vol.1 u. 3“ SNDMUSIC/Audiosparx
2011 "Summefeeling Popmusic vol.1 u. 3“ SNDMUSIC/Audiosparx
2011 "Pop International – Italo Vol 1“ SNDMUSIC/Audiosparx
2011 "Summer in the City – Popmusic Vol.1 u. 4“ SNDMUSIC/Audiosparx
2011 "Latin Pop Vocal 1 u. 3“ SNDMUSIC/Audiosparx
2011 "Summer Dreams 2 u. 3“ SNDMUSIC/Audiosparx
2011 "Fantasy Music 3“ SNDMUSIC/Audiosparx
2011 "Easy Listening Male Voices 1“ SNDMUSIC/Audiosparx
2011 "Family Music 3 2011“ SNDMUSIC/Audiosparx
2011 "European Rock and Pop 2“ SNDMUSIC/Audiosparx
2011 "Fantasy Music 4" SNDMUSIC/Audiosparx
2012 "Summer Evening 2“ SNDMUSIC/Audiosparx
2012 "Inspired by Shakira 2011“ SNDMUSIC/Audiosparx
2014 "My Ballad"  Wantreez Music
2014 "Pop Band Music" Wantreez Music
2015 "Vintage Plug 60: Session 66 - Pop, Rock, vol.5" SNDMUSIC
2015 "Inspired by Shakira - The Best in Latin Pop" SNDMUSIC
2016 "Summer & Pop Dance Ver.2" Wantreez Music
2016 "Midnight Blue" Wantreez Music
2017 "Gloomy European Song" Wantreez Music
2017 "Chill Tourist Set" Wantreez Music
2017 "Watching Stars Playlist" Wantreez Music
2017 "New Work out Plan" Wantreez Music
2017 "Afternoon Break" Wantreez Music
2017 "Latin & Samba Club" Wantreez Music
2017 "Good Music for You Vol.1" Wantreez Music
2017 "Great Pop Music Vol.1" Wantreez Music
2017 "Great Pop Music Vol.3" Wantreez Music
2017 "No Genre Just Music Vol.1" Wantreez Music
2017 "Boys n Girls Pop Vol.1" Wantreez Music
2017 "Boys n Girls Pop Vol.2" Wantreez Music
2017 "Late Night Pop" Wantreez Music
2017 "Sadness & Pop Ballad" Wantreez Music
2017 "Lovely Valentine's Day Pop" Wantreez Music
2017 "Tus Mejores Días"

External links
Official site Lorenzo Piani
Official site POP IN CLASSIC
 Deezer SHADES OF MUSIC 
 Tv RAI UNO 
Interview at Radio Emilia Romagna 
Review  Rock.it 
Official page on Reverbnation 
Review Musicenology 
Review Blogosphère
News: SENZA UN SORRISO
Release SENZA UN SORRISO

References

1955 births
2016 deaths
Italian male singers
Italian-language singers
People from Giulianova